Erline Perkins McGriff (February 18, 1924 Petersburg, Virginia - December 24, 2004) was a professor of nursing at the New York University Rory Meyers College of Nursing.  She became Division Head in 1976 helping to expand the graduate division of the school.  McGriff also served as the director of the Division of Nursing at Trenton State College.

Education
McGriff graduated from the Lucy Webb Hayes School of Nursing at Sibley Memorial Hospital in 1945. She earned her B.S. (nursing, 1950) and M.S. (administration in nursing services, 1953) degrees in Nursing Education from The Catholic University of America and her Ed.D. (administration in nursing education, 1967) from Teachers College, Columbia University.

Publications

References

External links
Erline McGriff papers, 1923-2002.

Catholic University of America alumni
American women nurses
Teachers College, Columbia University alumni
New York University faculty
American women academics

1924 births
2004 deaths